Nathuni Ram  is an Indian politician. He was elected to the lower House of the Indian Parliament the Lok Sabha from Nawada, Bihar as a member of the Janata Party.

References

Janata Party politicians
India MPs 1977–1979
Lok Sabha members from Bihar